Chicago Collections Consortium is a membership organization of more than 45 libraries, museums, historical societies, and other cultural heritage organizations collaborating to preserve and promote the history of the Chicago region.

History
Launched in 2015 after several years of planning among its charter members, Chicago Collections now sponsors a wide range of educational, community engagement, and professional development programs, including exhibitions and public lectures. Chicago Collections also provides information services such as its Cooperative Reference Network, as well as instructional materials available on member web sites. Chicago Collections has established partnerships with other non-profit organizations in the City of Chicago, including National Public Radio, Chicago Metro History Education Center, and the Library of Congress's Teaching with Primary Sources program, to answer questions about Chicago history from researchers and the general public, and to promote use of member collections and services by teachers and students of all ages.

With funding from The Andrew W. Mellon Foundation, Chicago Collections has developed EXPLORE Chicago Collections (ECC), a digital portal providing access to more than 117,000 images and 6,800 archival collections from member institutions (as of September 2019). The Center for Research Libraries awarded its 2016 Primary Source Award for Access to Tracy J. Seneca (University of Illinois at Chicago), for her role in leading the development of the ECC portal.

Governing Members

Art Institute of Chicago
Center for Research Libraries
Chicago Academy of Sciences/Peggy Notebaert Nature Museum
Chicago History Museum
Chicago Public Library
Chicago State University
Columbia College Chicago
DePaul University
Illinois Institute of Technology
Loyola University Chicago
Newberry Library
Northwestern University
Roosevelt University
University of Chicago
University of Illinois Chicago

Participating Members

Alliance Française
Dominican University
School of the Art Institute of Chicago
North Central College
North Park University
Museum of Contemporary Art, Chicago

Associate Members

Chicago Botanic Garden
Chicago Zoological Society
Creative Audio Archive
Francis Willard Historical Association
Hemingway Foundation of Oak Park
Lake Forest College
Lincoln Park Zoo
Oak Park Public Library
Theatre Historical Society of America
Adler Planetarium
Federal Reserve Bank of Chicago
Rush University Medical Center
Wilmette Historical Museum
Pritzker Military Museum & Library

Partner Program
Henry Crown and Company
Union League Club of Chicago

Notes

Additional References
Long, Elisabeth (October 22, 2015). “A Single Portal to Chicago’s History,” The University of Chicago News. Accessed September 17, 2016.

Strandmark, Matthew (September 11, 2017). "EXPLORE Chicago Collections," The American Archivist Reviews Portal. Accessed March 19, 2017.

Walter, Scott (February 2016). “It Takes a City: Chicago Collections Brings Collaboration to the Next Level,” ILA Reporter 34 (1).  Accessed September 21, 2016
 

Arts organizations based in Illinois
Organizations based in Chicago
Supraorganizations